The 2019–20 season was the 149th season in the existence of Le Havre AC and the club's 11th consecutive season in the second division of French football. In addition to the domestic league, Le Havre participated in this season's editions of the Coupe de France and Coupe de la Ligue.

Players

First-team squad

Out on loan

Pre-season and friendlies

Competitions

Overall record

Ligue 2

League table

Results summary

Results by round

Matches
The league fixtures were announced on 14 June 2019. The Ligue 2 matches were suspended by the LFP on 13 March 2020 due to COVID-19 until further notices. On 28 April 2020, it was announced that Ligue 1 and Ligue 2 campaigns would not resume, after the country banned all sporting events until September. On 30 April, The LFP ended officially the 2019–20 season.

Coupe de France

Coupe de la Ligue

References

Le Havre AC seasons
Le Havre